David Martin Evans, OAM (born 20 September 1967) is an Australian Paralympic athlete. He is an arm amputee, and his nickname was 'Clock'.

Career

Evans competed in the 1500m and 5000m at the 1984 New York/Stoke Mandeville Paralympics.
In 1991, the Australian Institute of Sport established an Athletics with a Disability Program and he became an inaugural scholarship holder and was coached by Chris Nunn. 
At the 1992 Barcelona Paralympics, Evans competed in four events – 400m, 800m, 1500m and 5000m.

Evans won three gold medals 800m, 1500m  and  T42-46 and a bronze medal in the 5000m at the 1st IPC Athletics World Championships in Berlin, Germany in 1994.

At the 1996 Atlanta Paralympics, he won two gold medals in the Men's 4 × 100 m Relay T42-46 event and the Men's 1,500 m T44-46 event, for which he received a Medal of the Order of Australia, and a silver medal in the Men's 800 m T44-46 event. He also competed in the 800m and 5000m.

In an interview, Evans commented "I spent too many years not training seriously because it was too easy to win in disabled events without doing any work. It was only when I came to the AIS and started using able bodied athletes as a yardstick that I really improved."

As of 2017, Evans is ranked the fifth in the leading male gold medallists tally for Australian Para-athletes at the IPC World Athletics Championships.

in 2012, Evans had a place on the board of management at 'Limbs 4 Life' as the secretary of the organisation. The mission of this organisation is to provide information and support to amputees and their families.

References

External links
 David Evans at Australian Athletics Historical Results
 

Paralympic athletes of Australia
Athletes (track and field) at the 1984 Summer Paralympics
Athletes (track and field) at the 1992 Summer Paralympics
Athletes (track and field) at the 1996 Summer Paralympics
Medalists at the 1996 Summer Paralympics
Paralympic gold medalists for Australia
Paralympic silver medalists for Australia
Middle-distance runners with limb difference
Recipients of the Medal of the Order of Australia
Australian Institute of Sport Paralympic track and field athletes
1967 births
Living people
Paralympic medalists in athletics (track and field)
Australian male middle-distance runners